Experience: Jill Scott 826+ is a live album by American singer Jill Scott, released on November 20, 2001, by Hidden Beach Recordings. The album was promoted by the singles "Gimme" and the live version of "He Loves Me (Lyzel in E Flat)", with videos shot for both.

The first disc contains concert recordings from her Words and Sounds Tour; the "826" in the album title refers to the August 26, 2001, concert in Washington, D.C., that comprises most of the live material. The "+" in the title refers to bonus material, including previously unreleased studio recordings, collected on the second disc.

Track listing

Disc one (826)
"Show Intro (Alright Man, It's Time for You to Move)" – 1:33
"A Long Walk (Groove)" (Jill Scott, Andre Harris) – 6:18
"Love Rain (Suite)" (Scott, Vidal Davis) – 12:30
"Slowly Surely" (Scott, Darren Henson, Don Thompson, Kamaal Fareed, Malik Taylor, Ali Shaheed Muhammad, James Yancey, Towa Tei, Bebel Gilberto) – 3:50
"One Is the Magic # (Redux)" (Scott, Davis) – 6:19
"Do You Remember" (Scott, Harris) – 8:40
"Gettin' In the Way" (Scott, Davis) – 7:42
"It's Love" (Scott, Henson, Keith Pelzer) – 7:36
"The Way" (featuring Mike Phillips) (Scott, Harris) – 8:26
"Fatback Taffy" (Scott) – 2:15
"He Loves Me (Lyzel In E Flat) (Movements I, II & III)" (Scott, Pelzer) – 9:02

Disc two (+)
"Free (Prelude)" (Scott, Harris) – 1:31
"Gotta Get Up (Another Day)" (featuring 4hero) (Scott, Mark Clair, Brad Munn) – 4:58
"One Time" (Scott, Davis, Eric Roberson) – 3:55
"Sweet Justice" (Scott, Davis, Henson) – 5:20
"Thickness" (Scott) – 11:02
"High Post Brotha" (featuring Common) (Scott, Ivan Barias, Lonnie Lynn, Dale Warren) – 3:41
"Gimme" (Scott, Barias, Randy Muller) – 3:33
"Be Ready" (Scott, Ted Thomas Jr., Jay Chattaway) – 3:13
"Free (Epilogue)"/"Gotta Get Up (Another Day)" (Minnie Version featuring 4hero) – 16:18

Charts

Weekly charts

Year-end charts

Certifications

References

2001 live albums
Albums produced by Dre & Vidal
Hidden Beach Recordings albums
Jill Scott (singer) live albums